The Shadow Cabinet of John Steenhuisen succeeded the Shadow Cabinet of Mmusi Maimane as the Official Opposition Shadow Cabinet. After John Steenhuisen was elected unopposed as the parliamentary leader by the Democratic Alliance's caucus on 27 October 2019, he announced a new shadow cabinet, on 5 December 2020.

In his capacity of DA leader, Steenhuisen leads the Official Opposition Shadow Cabinet. Serving alongside Steenhuisen is Siviwe Gwarube, as Chief Whip, and Annelie Lotriet as Chairperson of the Caucus.

Members of the Shadow Cabinet
Democratic Alliance parliamentary leader John Steenhuisen introduced a new Shadow Cabinet on 5 December 2020. He reshuffled it in August 2022.

Shadow Ministers in Standing Committees in the National Assembly

References

South African shadow cabinets